Suma Adda is an Indian Telugu-language television sketch comedy and variety talk show hosted by Suma Kanakala and produced by Mallemala Entertainments. Suma Adda premiered on ETV and ETV Win on 7 January 2023.

Production and concept 
Suma Adda replaced Cash 2.0 which was broadcast every Saturday at 9:00 p.m. Indian Standard Time.  The show has comedy sketches performed by various actors and games between the celebrity guests.

Episodes

References 

2023 Indian television series debuts
Indian television talk shows
Variety shows
Telugu-language television shows
ETV Telugu original programming
Indian game shows
Indian comedy television series